Alisa – Folge deinem Herzen ("Alisa - Follow Your Heart") was a German telenovela. It was filmed in the Potsdam Studio Babelsberg for ZDF in co-production with ORF and SF. 370 episodes were produced in two series between 2009 and 2010.

See also
List of German television series

External links
 

German telenovelas
2009 German television series debuts
2010 German television series endings
ZDF telenovelas
German-language television shows